Rail is an extinct town in east central Wright County, in the Ozarks of southern Missouri, United States. The GNIS classifies it as a populated place. The village was located on the west bank of Beaver Creek, just southeast of the intersection of Missouri routes 38 and 95.

A post office called Rail was established in 1888, and remained in operation until 1906. The community has the name of the local Rail family.

References

Ghost towns in Missouri
Former populated places in Wright County, Missouri